Gergeti Trinity Church ( - Tsminda Sameba) is a popular name for Holy Trinity Church near the village of Stepantsminda in Georgia.  The church is situated on the right bank of the river Chkheri (the left tributary of the river Terek), at an elevation of 2170 meters (7120 feet), under Mount Kazbek.

History
The Gergeti Trinity Church was built in the 14th century by an unknown architect, and is the only cross-cupola church in Khevi province. The separate belltower dates from the same period as the church itself, but built somewhat later. Its isolated location on top of a steep mountain surrounded by the vastness of nature has made it a symbol for Georgia. The 18th century Georgian author Vakhushti Batonishvili wrote that in times of danger, precious relics from Mtskheta, including Saint Nino's Cross were brought here for safekeeping. During the Soviet era, all religious services were prohibited, but the church remained a popular tourist destination. The church is now an active establishment of the Georgian Orthodox and Apostolic Church.

The church is a popular waypoint for trekkers in the area, and can be reached by a steep 1.5 hour climb up the mountain.

By December 2018 a paved/tarmac road has been laid up to the base of the church, accessible by any normal car. Since 2021, a landslide has prevented paved road access, and a unpaved road (requiring a 4WD) has been used instead.

Architecture
The iconic view of the church and Mount Kazbek is one of the best examples of harmonic combination of architecture and the landscape, so typical for the architecture of Georgia.  The church ensemble includes the church itself, the belltower and the surrounding wall. The church is a cross-in-square temple with three rectangular and one rounded (containing the apse) arms, and two entrances, from the south and from the west. Each arm has a window. Additional five windows of the tholobate provide sufficient illumination. The tholobate is rather stumpy, slightly narrowing in the upper part. The facade is clad in dark-grey stone. Only traces of the original murals remain. 

The outside decorations can essentially be found only around the doors and windows. The northern wall is the most simply decorated one: short-armed cross above and rounded ornamented stones below the narrow window. The southern wall, in addition to the cross, has ornamented quadrangles and an arch above the window. The western wall is rather similar, but with simple ornamentation of the window. Rather complex composition is found on the eastern wall. Its window has a quadrangular frame and a large cross above it. The cross itself has quadrangles at the base of each arm. In addition to the central window, there is a rounded window to left and a square window to the right. Both southern and western portals have rich decorations around the doors: the astragal, ornamented stripe, rosettes and quadrangles. Each of the ten windows of the dome also has an arch frame, made of astragal.

The belltower, standing to the south from the church,  is composed of the qubic base and the belfry above it. The base also serves as the entrances to the church ensemble. The walls have various small ornamentation, as well as a figure of an unknown person on the western side.

References 
Rosen, Roger. Georgia: A Sovereign Country of the Caucasus. Odyssey Publications: Hong Kong, 1999. 

http://agenda.ge/en/news/2018/2536

External links
Georgian government site

Churches in Georgia (country)
Religious sites in Georgia (country)
14th-century Eastern Orthodox church buildings
Buildings and structures in Mtskheta-Mtianeti